Toledot, Toldot, Toldos, or Toldoth (—Hebrew for "generations" or "descendants," the second word and the first distinctive word in the parashah) is the sixth weekly Torah portion (parashah) in the annual Jewish cycle of Torah reading. The parashah tells of the conflict between Jacob and Esau, Isaac's passing off his wife Rebekah as his sister, and Isaac's blessing of his sons.

It constitutes . The parashah is made up of 5,426 Hebrew letters, 1,432 Hebrew words, 106 verses, and 173 lines in a Torah Scroll (Sefer Torah). Jews read it the sixth Sabbath after Simchat Torah, generally in November, or rarely in early December.

Readings
In the Masoretic Text of the Tanakh (Hebrew Bible), Parashat Toledot has two "open portion" (petuchah) divisions (roughly equivalent to paragraphs, often abbreviated with the Hebrew letter  (peh)). Parashat Toledot has three "closed portion" (setumah) divisions (abbreviated with the Hebrew letter  (samekh)), that further divide the second open portion. The first open portion divides the first reading. The second open portion spans the balance of the parashah. Two closed portion divisions further divide the fifth reading, setting apart the discussion of Esau's marriage to the two Hittite women.

First reading—Genesis 25:19–26:5
In the first reading, Isaac was 40 years old when he married Rebekah, and when the couple proved unable to conceive, Isaac pleaded with God on Rebekah's behalf, and God allowed Rebekah to conceive. As twins struggled in her womb, she inquired of God, who answered her that two separate nations were in her womb, one mightier than the other, and the older would serve the younger. When Rebekah gave birth, the first twin emerged red and hairy, so they named him Esau, and his brother emerged holding Esau's heel, so they named him Jacob. Isaac was 60 years old when they were born. Esau became a skillful hunter and outdoorsman, but Jacob remained a mild man and camp-bound. Isaac favored Esau for his game, but Rebekah favored Jacob. Once when Jacob was cooking, Esau returned to the camp famished and demanded some of Jacob's red stew. Jacob demanded that Esau first sell him his birthright, and Esau did so with an oath, spurning his birthright. The first open portion ends here with the end of chapter .

As the reading continues in chapter , another famine struck the land, and Isaac went to the house of the Philistine King Abimelech in Gerar. God told Isaac not to go down to Egypt, but to stay in the land that God would show him, for God would remain with him, bless him, and assign the land to him and his numerous heirs, as God had sworn to Abraham, who had obeyed God and kept God's commandments. The first reading ends here.

Second reading—Genesis 26:6–12
In the second reading, Isaac settled in Gerar, and when the men of Gerar asked Isaac about his beautiful wife, he said that she was his sister out of fear that the men might kill him on account of her. But looking out of the window, Abimelech saw Isaac fondling Rebekah, and Abimelech summoned Isaac to complain that Isaac had called her his sister. Isaac explained that he had done so to save his life. Abimelech complained that one of the people might have lain with her, and Isaac would have brought guilt upon the Philistines, and Abimelech charged the people not to molest Isaac or Rebekah, on pain of death. God blessed Isaac, who reaped bountiful harvests. The second reading ends here.

Third reading—Genesis 26:13–22
In the third reading, Isaac grew very wealthy, to the envy of the Philistines. The Philistines stopped up all the wells that Abraham's servants had dug, and Abimelech sent Isaac away, for his household had become too big. So Isaac left to settle in the wadi of Gerar, where he dug anew the wells that Abraham's servants had dug and called them by the same names that his father had. But when Isaac's servants dug two new wells, the herdsmen of Gerar quarreled with Isaac's herdsmen and claimed them for their own, so Isaac named those wells Esek and Sitnah. Isaac moved on and dug a third well, and they did not quarrel over it, so he named it Rehoboth. The third reading ends here.

Fourth reading—Genesis 26:23–29
In the fourth reading, Isaac went to Beersheba, and that night God appeared to Isaac, telling Isaac not to fear, for God was with him, and would bless him and increase his offspring for Abraham's sake. So Isaac built an altar and invoked the Lord by name. And Isaac pitched his tent there and his servants began digging a well. Then Abimelech, Ahuzzath his councilor, and Phicol his general came to Isaac, and Isaac asked them why they had come, since they had driven Isaac away. They answered that they now recognized that God had been with Isaac, and sought a treaty that neither would harm the other. The fourth reading ends here.

Fifth reading—Genesis 26:30–27:27
In the fifth reading, Isaac threw a feast for the Philistines, and the next morning, they exchanged oaths and the Philistines departed from him in peace. Later in the day, Isaac's servants told him that they had found water, and Isaac named the well Shibah, so that place became known as Beersheba. A closed portion ends here.

In the continuation of the reading, when Esau was 40 years old, he married two Hittite women, Judith and Basemath, causing bitterness for Isaac and Rebekah. Another closed portion ends here with the end of chapter .

As the reading continues in chapter ,
when Isaac was old and his sight had dimmed, he called Esau and asked him to hunt some game and prepare a dish, so that Isaac might give him his innermost blessing before he died. Rebekah had been listening, and when Esau departed, she instructed Jacob to fetch her two choice kids so that she might prepare a dish that Jacob could take to Isaac and receive his blessing. Jacob complained to Rebekah that since Esau was hairy, Isaac might touch him, discover him to be a trickster, and curse him. But Rebekah called the curse upon herself, insisting that Jacob do as she directed. So Jacob got the kids, and Rebekah prepared a dish, had Jacob put on Esau's best clothes, and covered Jacob's hands and neck with the kid's skins. When Jacob went to Isaac, he asked which of his sons had arrived, and Jacob said that he was Esau and asked for Isaac's blessing. Isaac asked him how he had succeeded so quickly, and he said that God had granted him good fortune. Isaac asked Jacob to come closer that Isaac might feel him to determine whether he was really Esau. Isaac felt him and wondered that the voice was Jacob's, but the hands were Esau's. Isaac questioned if it was really Esau, and when Jacob assured him, Isaac asked for the game and Jacob served him the kids and wine. Isaac bade his son to come close and kiss him, and Isaac smelled his clothes, remarking that he smelled like the fields. The fifth reading ends here.

Sixth reading—Genesis 27:28–28:4
In the sixth reading, Isaac blessed Jacob, asking God to give him abundance, make peoples serve him, make him master over his brothers, curse those who cursed him, and bless those who blessed him. Just as Jacob left, Esau returned from the hunt, prepared a dish for Isaac, and asked Isaac for his blessing. Isaac asked who he was, and Esau said that it was he. Isaac trembled and asked who it was then who had served him, received his blessing, and now must remain blessed. Esau burst into sobbing, and asked Isaac to bless him too, but Isaac answered that Jacob had taken Esau's blessing with guile. Esau asked whether Jacob had been so named that he might supplant Esau twice, first taking his birthright and now his blessing. Esau asked Isaac whether he had not reserved a blessing for Esau, but Isaac answered that he had made Jacob master over him and sustained him with grain and wine, and asked what, then, he could still do for Esau. Esau wept and pressed Isaac to bless him, too, so Isaac blessed him to enjoy the fat of the earth and the dew of heaven, to live by his sword and to serve his brother, but also to break his yoke. Esau harbored a grudge against Jacob, and told himself that he would kill Jacob upon Isaac's death. When Esau's words reached Rebekah, she told Jacob to flee to Haran and her brother Laban and remain there until Esau's fury subsided and Rebekah fetched him from there, so that Rebekah would not lose both sons in one day. Rebekah told Isaac her disgust with the idea that Jacob might marry a Hittite woman, so Isaac sent for Jacob, blessed him, and instructed him not to take a Canaanite wife, but to go to Padan-aram and the house of Bethuel to take a wife from among Laban's daughters. And Isaac blessed Jacob with fertility and the blessing of Abraham, that he might possess the land that God had assigned to Abraham. The sixth reading ends here.

Seventh reading—Genesis 28:5–9
In the seventh reading, when Esau saw that Isaac had blessed Jacob and charged him not to take a Canaanite wife, Esau realized that the Canaanite women displeased Isaac, and Esau married Ishmael's daughter Mahalath.

Readings according to the triennial cycle
Jews who read the Torah according to the triennial cycle of Torah reading read the parashah according to the following schedule:

In inner-biblical interpretation
The parashah has parallels or is discussed in these Biblical sources:

Genesis chapter 25
 reports that Rebekah "went to inquire (lidrosh)  of the Lord." 1 Samuel  explains, "Formerly in Israel, when a man went to inquire (lidrosh)  of God, he said: 'Come and let us go to the seer'; for he who is now called a prophet was formerly called a seer."

Hosea taught that God once punished Jacob for his conduct, requiting him for his deeds, including that (as reported in ) in the womb he tried to supplant his brother.

Genesis chapter 26
In , God reminded Isaac that God had promised Abraham that God would make his heirs as numerous as the stars. In , God promised that Abraham's descendants would as numerous as the stars of heaven. In , Jacob reminded God that God had promised that Jacob's descendants would be as numerous as the sands. In , Moses reminded God that God had promised to make the Patriarch's descendants as numerous as the stars. In , Moses reported that God had multiplied the Israelites until they were then as numerous as the stars. In , Moses reported that God had made the Israelites as numerous as the stars. And  foretold that the Israelites would be reduced in number after having been as numerous as the stars.

Genesis chapter 27–28
Whereas the first blessing is one of material wellbeing and dominance, only the second and third blessings convey fertility and the Land of Israel. The first and the third blessings explicitly designate Jacob as the conveyor of blessing, although arguably the second blessing does that as well by giving Jacob "the blessing of Abraham." (See .) Only the third blessing vouchsafes God's Presence with Jacob.

In classical rabbinic interpretation
The parashah is discussed in these rabbinic sources from the era of the Mishnah and the Talmud:

Genesis chapter 25
Rabbi Judah taught that Rebekah was barren for 20 years. After 20 years, Isaac took Rebekah to Mount Moriah, to the place where he had been bound, and he prayed on her behalf concerning conception, and God was entreated, as  says, "And Isaac entreated the Lord."

Rava argued that one may deduce from Isaac's example that a man may remain for 20 years with an infertile wife. For of Isaac,  says, "And Isaac was 40 years old when he took Rebekah . . . to be his wife," and  says, "And Isaac was 60 years old when she bore them" (which shows that Isaac waited 20 years). Rav Nachman replied that Isaac was infertile (and he knew that the couple was childless because of him). Rabbi Isaac taught that  does not say "for his wife" but "opposite his wife." Rabbi Isaac deduced from this that both were barren (as he had to pray for himself as well as her). The Gemara countered that if this were so, then  should not read, "And the Lord let Himself be entreated by him," but rather should read, "And the Lord let Himself be entreated by them" (as Isaac's prayer was on behalf of them both). But the Gemara explained that  reads, "And the Lord let Himself be entreated by him," because the prayer of a righteous person who is the child of a righteous person (Isaac son of Abraham) is even more effective than the prayer of a righteous person who is the child of a wicked person (Rebekah daughter of Bethuel). Rabbi Isaac taught that the Patriarchs and Matriarchs were infertile because God longs to hear the prayer of the righteous.

Noting that the three-letter root  used in  can mean either "entreat" or "pitchfork," Rabbi Eleazar (or others say Rabbi Isaac or Resh Lakish) taught that the prayers of the righteous are like a pitchfork. Just as the pitchfork turns the grain from place to place in the barn, so the prayers of the righteous turn the mind of God from the attribute of harshness to that of mercy.

The Midrash taught that the words "for (, lenokhach) his wife" taught that Isaac prostrated himself in one spot and Rebekah in another (opposite him), and he prayed to God that all the children whom God would grant him would come from this righteous woman, and Rebekah prayed likewise.

The Pesikta de-Rav Kahana taught that Rebekah was one of seven barren women about whom  says (speaking of God), "He . . . makes the barren woman to dwell in her house as a joyful mother of children." The Pesikta de-Rav Kahana also listed Sarah, Rachel, Leah, Manoah's wife, Hannah, and Zion.

Rabbi Berekiah in Rabbi Levi's name read  to say, "The blessing of the destroyer (oved) came upon me," and interpreted "The blessing of the destroyer (oved)" to allude to Laban the Syrian. Rabbi Berekiah in Rabbi Levi's name thus read  to say, "An Aramean (Laban) sought to destroy (oved) my father (Jacob)." This interpretation thus reads , oved, as a transitive verb.) Rabbi Berekiah and Rabbi Levi in the name of Rabbi Hama ben Haninah thus explained that Rebekah was remembered with the blessing of children only after Isaac prayed for her, so that the heathens in Rebekah's family might not say that their prayer in  caused that result. Rather, God answered Isaac's prayer, as  reports, "And Isaac entreated the Lord for his wife . . . and his wife Rebekah conceived."

It was taught in Rabbi Nehemiah's name that Rebekah merited that the twelve tribes should spring directly from her.

When she stood near synagogues or schools, Jacob struggled to come out, while when she passed idolatrous temples, Esau struggled to come out.

The Midrash concluded that Rebekah went to the school of Shem and Eber to inquire. The Midrash deduced that this teaches that to visit a Sage is like visiting the Divine Presence.

Reading , "the Lord said to her," Rabbi Iddi taught that God spoke to her through the medium of an angel. Rabbi Ba bar Kahana said that God’s word came to her through an intermediary. Rabbi Haggai said in Rabbi Isaac's name that Rebekah was a prophet, as were all of the matriarchs.

The Rabbis of the Talmud read Edom to stand for Rome.

Reading the words, "and Jacob was a quiet man, dwelling in tents," the Midrash taught that Jacob dwelt in two tents, the academy of Shem and the academy of Eber.

Rabbi Haninah taught that Esau paid great attention to his parent (horo), his father, whom he supplied with meals, as  reports, "Isaac loved Esau, because he ate of his venison." Rabbi Samuel the son of Rabbi Gedaliah concluded that God decided to reward Esau for this.

Bar Kappara discussed the question with Rabbi Jose bar Patros. One of them said that Jacob declared that as Isaac had been eager for his food (for, as  reports, Isaac loved Esau because Esau brought Isaac venison), so Jacob was eager for his food (and thus was headed to Egypt to avoid the famine). The other explained that as Isaac had distinguished between his sons (as  reports, loving Esau more than Jacob), so Jacob would distinguish among his sons (going to Egypt for Joseph's account alone). But then Jacob noted on reconsideration that Isaac was responsible for only one soul, whereas Jacob was responsible for 70 souls.

In the Land of Israel they taught in the name of Rabbah bar Mari that it was appropriate to cook lentils because just as the lentil has no mouth (no groove like other legumes), so the mourner has no mouth to talk but sits silently. Others explained that just as the lentil is round, so mourning comes round to all people.

Rabbi Johanan deduced from Esau's words, "Behold, I am on the way to die," in  that Esau denied the resurrection of the dead. And for Esau's fifth sin, Rabbi Johanan cited the report of  that "Esau despised his birthright."

Genesis chapter 26
A Midrash cited  to show that there is double rejoicing in the case of a righteous one who is the child of a righteous one. The Mishnah and Tosefta deduced from  that Abraham kept the entire Torah even before it was revealed.

The Tosefta reported that when Abraham was alive, the wells gushed forth water, but the Philistines filled the wells with earth (as reported in ), for after Abraham died the wells no longer gushed forth water, and the Philistines filled them so that they would not provide cover for invaders. But when Isaac came along, the wells gushed water again (as indicated in ) and there was plenty again (as indicated in )

Interpreting God's command to Isaac in  not to go to Egypt, Rabbi Hoshaya taught that God told Isaac that he was (by virtue of his near sacrifice in ) a burnt-offering without blemish, and as a burnt offering became unfit if it was taken outside of the Temple grounds, so would Isaac become unfit if he went outside of the Promised Land.

With the letter tsade, God will redeem Israel from the oppression of the kingdoms, and God will say to Israel, I have caused a branch to spring forth for you, as  says, "Behold, the man whose name is the Branch (zemach); and he shall grow up (yizmach) out of his place, and he shall build the temple of the Lord." These letters were delivered to Abraham. Jacob's son Asher delivered the mystery of the Redemption to his daughter Serah. When Moses and Aaron came to the elders of Israel and performed signs in their sight, the elders told Serah. She told them that there is no reality in signs. The elders told her that Moses said, "God will surely visit (pakod yifkod) you" (as in ). Serah told the elders that Moses was the one who would redeem Israel from Egypt, for she heard (in the words of ), "I have surely visited (pakod pakadeti) you." The people immediately believed in God and Moses, as  says, "And the people believed, and when they heard that the Lord had visited the children of Israel."

Reading , “And Isaac sowed in that land, and found in that year a hundredfold (she'arim),” a Midrash taught that the words, “a hundred , she'arim” indicate that they estimated it, but it produced a hundred times the estimate, for blessing does not rest upon that which is weighed, measured, or counted. They measured solely on account of the tithes.

A Midrash reread , "Then Abimelech went to him from Gerar (mi-gerar)," to say that Abimelech came "wounded" (megorar), teaching that ruffians entered Abimelech's house and assailed him all night. Alternatively, the Midrash taught that he came "scraped" (megurad), teaching that eruptions broke out on Abimelech and he kept scraping himself.

The Sifre read  to indicate that Moses spoke to the Israelites in rebuke. The Sifre taught that Moses rebuked them only when he approached death, and the Sifre taught that Moses learned this lesson from Jacob, who admonished his sons in  only when he neared death. The Sifre cited four reasons why people do not admonish others until the admonisher nears death: (1) so that the admonisher does not have to repeat the admonition, (2) so that the one rebuked would not suffer undue shame from being seen again, (3) so that the one rebuked would not bear ill will to the admonisher, and (4) so that the one may depart from the other in peace, for admonition brings peace.

A Midrash taught that Abimelech first sent Phicol, the captain of his host, but he was unable to pacify Isaac. Then Abimelech sent his friend Ahuzzath, but Isaac still remained unpacified. When Abimelech then went himself, Isaac allowed himself to be appeased. Hence, the Sages taught that one need not ask another's forgiveness more than three times. If the other does not forgive the third time, then the other becomes the wrongdoer.

The Pirke De-Rabbi Eliezer told how Isaac made a covenant with the Philistines, when he sojourned there. Isaac noticed that the Philistines turned their faces away from him. So Isaac left them in peace, and Abimelech and his magnates came after him. Paraphrasing , the Pirke De-Rabbi Eliezer told that Isaac asked them why they came to him, after having turned aside their faces from him. Paraphrasing , the Pirke De-Rabbi Eliezer told that the Philistines replied that they knew that God would give the Land of Israel to Isaac's descendants, and thus they asked him to make a covenant with them that his descendants would not take possession of the land of the Philistines. And so Isaac made a covenant with them. He cut off one cubit of the bridle of the donkey upon which he was riding, and he gave it to them so that they might thereby have a sign of the covenant.

Rabbi Phinehas (and other say Rabbi Helkiah) taught in Rabbi Simon's name that Moses and Asaph (author of ) exposed the Romans' deception. Asaph said in  "The boar of the wood ravages it." The Midrash explained that Scripture compares the Roman Empire to a swine, because when the swine lies down, it puts out its parted hoofs, as if to advertise that it is clean. And so the Midrash taught that the wicked Roman Empire robbed and oppressed, yet pretended to execute justice. So the Midrash taught that for 40 years, Esau would ensnare married women and violate them, yet when he reached the age of 40, he compared himself to his righteous father Isaac, telling himself that as his father Isaac was 40 years old when he married (as reported in ), so he too would marry at the age of 40.

Genesis chapter 27
Rabbi Hama bar Hanina taught that our ancestors were never without a scholars' council. Abraham was an elder and a member of the scholars' council, as  says, "And Abraham was an elder (zaken) well stricken in age." Eliezer, Abraham's servant, was an elder and a member of the scholars' council, as  says, "And Abraham said to his servant, the elder of his house, who ruled over all he had," which Rabbi Eleazar explained to mean that he ruled over—and thus knew and had control of—the Torah of his master. Isaac was an elder and a member of the scholars' council, as  says: "And it came to pass when Isaac was an elder (zaken)." Jacob was an elder and a member of the scholars' council, as  says, "Now the eyes of Israel were dim with age (zoken)." In Egypt they had the scholars' council, as  says, "Go and gather the elders of Israel together."

But Rabbi Isaac taught that Abimelech's curse of Sarah caused her son Isaac's blindness. Rabbi Isaac read the words, "it is for you a covering (kesut) of the eyes," in  not as kesut, "covering," but as kesiyat, "blinding." Rabbi Isaac concluded that one should not consider a small matter the curse of even an ordinary person.

Rabbi Eleazar taught that deceptive speech is like idolatry.

Rabbi Johanan taught that when Jacob explained his rapid success in obtaining the meat by saying in  that it was "because the Lord your God sent me good speed," he was like a raven bringing fire to his nest, courting disaster. For when Jacob said "the Lord your God sent me good speed," Isaac thought to himself that he knew that Esau did not customarily mention the name of God, and if the person before him did so, he must not have been Esau but Jacob.

Rabbi Judah ben Pazi interpreted Isaac's blessing of Jacob with dew in  merely to pass along to his son what God had deeded to his father Abraham for all time. And Rabbi Ishmael deduced from Isaac's curse of those who cursed Jacob and blessing of those who blessed Jacob in  that Jews need not respond to those who curse or bless them, for the Torah has already decreed the response.

Rabbi Judan said that Jacob declared that Isaac blessed him with five blessings, and God correspondingly appeared five times to Jacob and blessed him (and ). Rabbi Judan also said that Jacob wanted to thank God for permitting Jacob to see the fulfillment of those blessings. (And thus Jacob mentioned Isaac then on going down to witness Joseph's greatness.)

The Pirke De-Rabbi Eliezer noted that the first blessings with which Isaac blessed Jacob in  concerned dew and grain—material blessings. The final blessings in  concerned the foundation of the world, and were without interruption either in this world or in the world to come, for  says, "And God Almighty bless you." And Isaac further added the blessing of Abraham, as  says, "And may He give you the blessing of Abraham, to you and to your seed with you." Therefore, the Pirke De-Rabbi Eliezer concluded that the end of the thing—Isaac's final blessing of Jacob—was better than the beginning thereof.

Interpreting why in  "Isaac trembled very exceedingly," Rabbi Johanan observed that it was surely unusual for a man who has two sons to tremble when one goes out and the other comes in. Rabbi Johanan taught that Isaac trembled because when Esau came in, Gehenna came in with him. Rabbi Aha said that the walls of the house began to seethe from the heat of Gehenna. Hence  asks, "who then (eifo)?" for Isaac asked who would be roast (leafot) in Gehenna, him or Jacob?

Rabbi Hama bar Hanina taught that Isaac thereby hinted at Rebekah's intervention.

Of Abraham,  says, "And the Lord blessed Abraham with everything." And of Jacob,  says, "Because I have everything." Thus, already in their lifetimes, they merited everything, perfection. The Gemara read these three verses also to teach that Abraham, Isaac, and Jacob were three people over whom the evil inclination had no sway, as Scripture says about them, respectively, "with everything," "from everything," and "everything," and the completeness of their blessings meant that they did not have to contend with their evil inclinations. And the Gemara read these same three verses to teach that Abraham, Isaac, and Jacob were three of six people over whom the Angel of Death had no sway in their demise—Abraham, Isaac, Jacob, Moses, Aaron, and Miriam. As Abraham, Isaac, and Jacob were blessed with everything, the Gemara reasoned, they were certainly spared the anguish of the Angel of Death.

Rabbi Tarfon taught that God came from Mount Sinai (or others say Mount Seir) and was revealed to the children of Esau, as  says, "The Lord came from Sinai, and rose from Seir to them," and "Seir" means the children of Esau, as  says, "And Esau dwelt in Mount Seir." God asked them whether they would accept the Torah, and they asked what was written in it. From there, God turned and was revealed to the children of Ishmael, as  says, "He shined forth from Mount Paran," and "Paran" means the children of Ishmael, as  says of Ishmael, "And he dwelt in the wilderness of Paran." God asked them whether they would accept the Torah, and they asked what was written in it. From there, God sent messengers to all the nations of the world asking them whether they would accept the Torah, and they asked what was written in it. They replied that they had no delight in the Torah, therefore let God give it to God's people, as  says, "The Lord will give strength [identified with the Torah] to His people; the Lord will bless His people with peace." From there, God returned and was revealed to the children of Israel, as  says, "And he came from the ten thousands of holy ones," and the expression "ten thousands" means the children of Israel, as  says, "And when it rested, he said, ‘Return, O Lord, to the ten thousands of the thousands of Israel.’" With God were thousands of chariots and 20,000 angels, and God’s right hand held the Torah, as  says, "At his right hand was a fiery law to them."

The Midrash Tehillim told the circumstances in which Esau sought to carry out his desire that  reports, "Let the days of mourning for my father be at hand; then will I slay my brother Jacob." The Midrash Tehillim interpreted , "You have given me the necks of my enemies," to allude to Judah, because Rabbi Joshua ben Levi reported an oral tradition that Judah slew Esau after the death of Isaac. Esau, Jacob, and all Jacob's children went to bury Isaac, as  reports, "Esau, Jacob, and his sons buried him," and they were all in the Cave of Machpelah sitting and weeping. At last Jacob's children stood up, paid their respects to Jacob, and left the cave so that Jacob would not be humbled by weeping exceedingly in their presence. But Esau reentered the cave, thinking that he would kill Jacob, as  reports, "And Esau said in his heart: ‘Let the days of mourning for my father be at hand; then will I slay my brother Jacob.’" But Judah saw Esau go back and perceived at once that Esau meant to kill Jacob in the cave. Quickly Judah slipped after him and found Esau about to slay Jacob. So Judah killed Esau from behind. The neck of the enemy was given into Judah’s hands alone, as Jacob blessed Judah in  saying, "Your hand shall be on the neck of your enemies."

Reading , Rabbi Eleazar contrasted Esau's jealousy with Reuben's magnanimity. As  reports, Esau voluntarily sold his birthright, but as  says, "Esau hated Jacob," and as  says, "And he said, ‘Is not he rightly named Jacob? for he has supplanted me these two times.'" In Reuben's case, Joseph took Reuben's birthright from him against his will, as  reports, "for as much as he defiled his father's couch, his birthright was given to the sons of Joseph." Nonetheless, Reuben was not jealous of Joseph, as  reports, "And Reuben heard it, and delivered him out of their hand."

Genesis chapter 28
A Tanna taught in a Baraita that the exalted position of a groom atones for his sins. The Gemara cited  as a proof text. The Gemara noted that  reports that "Esau went to Ishmael, and took Machalat the daughter of Ishmael, as a wife," but  identifies Esau's wife as "Basemat, Ishmael's daughter." The Gemara explained that the name Machalat is cognate with the Hebrew word for forgiveness, mechilah, and thus deduced that  teaches that Esau's sins were forgiven upon his marriage.

Jacob found Esau and his sons and wives there dwelling in Isaac's tents, so Jacob spread his tent apart from Esau's. Isaac rejoiced at seeing Jacob. Rabbi Levi said that in the hour when Isaac was dying, he left his cattle, possessions, and all that he had to his two sons, and therefore they both loved him, and thus  reports, "And Esau and Jacob his sons buried him." The Pirke De-Rabbi Eliezer told that after that, Esau told Jacob to divide Isaac's holdings into two portions, and Esau would choose first between the two portions as a right of being the older. Perceiving that Esau had his eye set on riches, Jacob divided the land of Israel and the Cave of Machpelah in one part and all the rest of Isaac's holdings in the other part. Ishmael told Esau that the Amorite and the Canaanite were in the land, so Esau should take the balance of Isaac's holdings, and Jacob would have nothing. So Esau took Isaac's wealth and gave Jacob the land of Israel and the Cave of Machpelah, and they wrote a perpetual deed between them. Jacob then told Esau to leave the land, and Esau took his wives, children, and all that he had, as  reports, "And Esau took his wives . . . and all his possessions which he had gathered in the land of Canaan, and went into a land away from his brother Jacob." As a reward, God gave Esau a hundred provinces from Seir to Magdiel, as  reports, and Magdiel is Rome. Then Jacob dwelt safely and in peace in the land of Israel.

In medieval Jewish interpretation

The parashah is discussed in these medieval Jewish sources:

Genesis chapter 25
Maimonides noted that others have explained these words by saying that God spoke to Rebekah through an angel. Maimonides taught that by "angel" Eber is meant, as a prophet is sometimes called an "angel." Alternatively, Maimonides taught that  may refer to the angel that appeared to Eber in his vision.

Genesis chapter 27
Rabbi Simeon taught that with these words, Isaac indicated that Jacob's children would rise again from the dead at the time to come, by means of heavenly dew that shall issue forth from God. Rabbi Abba responded to Rabbi Simeon that there was more significance to Isaac's blessing than he had thought.

Nachmanides taught that from the moment that Isaac blessed Jacob, Isaac knew from Divine inspiration that his blessing rested on Jacob. This was then the reason for his violent trembling, for he knew that his beloved son Esau had lost the blessing forever. After he said (in ) "Who then is he who came," Isaac realized that Jacob had been the one who came before him to receive the blessing.

The Baal HaTurim concluded that this hints at the Mishnaic dictum (in Avot 4:15) that one should always reach out to be the first to greet any person, even an adversary.

In modern interpretation
The parashah is discussed in these modern sources:

Genesis chapters 25–33
Hermann Gunkel wrote that the legend cycle of Jacob-Esau-Laban divided clearly into the legends (1) of Jacob and Esau, (2) of Jacob and Laban, (3) of the origin of the twelve tribes, and (4) of the origin of ritual observances (22–32).

Walter Brueggemann suggested a chiastic structure to the Jacob narrative (shown in the chart below), moving from conflict with Esau to reconciliation with Esau. Within that is conflict with Laban moving to covenant with Laban. And within that, at the center, is the narrative of births, in which the birth of Joseph (at ) marks the turning point in the entire narrative, after which Jacob looks toward the Land of Israel and his brother Esau. In the midst of the conflicts are the two major encounters with God, which occur at crucial times in the sequence of conflicts.

Fretheim concluded that these four instances of Divine speaking link to each other in complex ways.

Genesis chapter 25

In this etiological reading, that Esau and Jacob were twins explained the close connection between Edom and Israel, their similar dialects, and cultural and kinship ties, while the competition between Esau and Jacob explained the off-and-on enmity between Edom and Israel in the Biblical period. Kugel reported that some biblical scholars saw an analogue in Israelite history: Esau's descendants, the Edomites, had been a sovereign nation while the future Israel was still in formation (see ), making Edom the "older brother" of Israel. But then, in the 10th century BCE, David unified Israel and conquered Edom (see ; ; and ), and that is why the oracle  gave Rebekah during her pregnancy said that "the older will end up serving the younger." Kugel reported that scholars thus view the stories of the young Jacob and Esau as created to reflect a political reality that came about in the time of David, indicating that these narratives were first composed in the early 10th century BCE, before the Edomites succeeded in throwing off their Israelite overlords, at that time when Israel might feel "like a little kid who had ended up with a prize that was not legitimately his." When Edom regained its independence, the stolen blessing story underwent a change (or perhaps was created out of whole cloth to reflect Edom's resurgence).

Gary Rendsburg read in —which personifies Edom, a Transjordanian state ruled by David and Solomon, as the brother of Jacob/Israel—to indicate that the author of Genesis sought to portray the ancestor of this country as related to the patriarchs in order to justify Israelite rule over Edom. Rendsburg noted that during the United Monarchy, Israel governed most firmly the nations geographically closest to Israel. 2 Samuel reports that while Israel permitted the native kings of Moab and Ammon to rule as tributary vassals, Israel deposed the king of Edom, and David and Solomon exercised direct rule over their southeastern neighbor. Rendsburg concluded that royal scribes living in Jerusalem during the reigns of David and Solomon in the tenth century BCE were responsible for Genesis; their ultimate goal was to justify the monarchy in general, and the kingship of David and Solomon in particular; and Genesis thus appears as a piece of political propaganda.

Rendsburg noted that Genesis often repeats the motif of the younger son. Rendsburg explained Genesis's interest with this motif by recalling that David was the youngest of Jesse’s seven sons (see ), and Solomon was among the youngest, if not the youngest, of David’s sons (see ). The issue of who among David’s many sons would succeed him dominates the Succession Narrative in  through . The two remaining candidates were Adonijah (David’s fourth son) and Solomon, and although Adonijah was older (and once claimed the throne when David was old and feeble in ), Solomon won out. Rendsburg argued that even though firstborn royal succession was the norm in the ancient Near East, the authors of Genesis justified Solomonic rule by imbedding the notion of ultimogeniture into Genesis’s national epic. An Israelite could thus not criticize David’s selection of Solomon to succeed him as king over Israel, because Genesis reported that God had favored younger sons since Abel and blessed younger sons of Israel—Isaac, Jacob, Judah, Joseph, Perez, and Ephraim—since the inception of the covenant.

Alter suggested that Rebekah's words might even be construed as a broken-off sentence—"Then why am I . . . ?"

Fretheim observed an ambiguity in the language of  The brother who would be stronger was not necessarily the brother who would be served. Fretheim wrote that  predicted either that the older (Esau) would be the weaker of the two and would serve the younger (Jacob), or, more likely, that the older would be the stronger and would serve the younger.

And Richard Elliott Friedman noted that readers usually take  to convey that God told Rebekah that her younger son, Jacob, would dominate her older son, Esau. Thus some have argued that Rebekah did not manipulate the succession when she sent Jacob to pose as Esau, but simply fulfilled God's will. But Friedman called this reading of  a misunderstanding of the "subtle, exquisitely ambiguous" wording of the verse. Friedman wrote that in Biblical Hebrew, the subject may either precede or follow the verb, and the object may either precede or follow the verb. Thus, Friedman argued that it is sometimes impossible to tell which word is the subject and which is the object, especially in poetry. Friedman concluded that "like the Delphic oracles in Greece, this prediction contains two opposite meanings, and thus the person who receives it—Rebekah—can hear whatever she wants (consciously or subconsciously) to hear."

Reading , "Jacob cooked food," Ohr ha-Chaim suggested that Jacob did so because he saw how effective Esau's providing Isaac with delicious meals had been in cementing Isaac's love for Esau, and thus Jacob tried to emulate Esau's success.

Genesis chapter 26
In , God reminded Isaac that God had promised Abraham that God would make his heirs as numerous as the stars. In , God promised that Abraham's descendants would be as numerous as the stars of heaven. In , God promised that the Abraham's descendants would be as numerous as the stars of heaven and the sands on the seashore. Carl Sagan reported that there are more stars in the universe than sands on all the beaches on the Earth.

Baruch Spinoza read the report of  that Abraham observed the worship, precepts, statutes, and laws of God to mean that Abraham observed the worship, statutes, precepts, and laws of king Melchizedek.  Spinoza read  to relate that Melchizedek was king of Jerusalem and priest of the Most High God, that in the exercise of his priestly functions (like those  describes) he blessed Abraham, and that Abraham gave to this priest of God a tithe of all his spoils.  Spinoza deduced from this that before God founded the Israelite nation, God constituted kings and priests in Jerusalem, and ordained for them rites and laws. Spinoza deduced that while Abraham sojourned in the city, he lived scrupulously according to these laws, for Abraham had received no special rites from God.

Reading the three instances of the wife-sister motif in (a) ; (b) ; and (c) , Speiser argued that in a work by a single author, these three cases would present serious contradictions:  Abraham would have learned nothing from his narrow escape in Egypt, and so tried the same ruse in Gerar; and Abimelech would have been so little sobered by his perilous experience with Abraham and Sarah that he fell into the identical trap with Isaac and Rebekah.  Speiser concluded (on independent grounds) that the Jahwist was responsible for incidents (a) and (c), while the Elohist was responsible for incident (b).  If the Elohist had been merely an annotator of the Jahwist, however, the Elohist would still have seen the contradictions for Abimelech, a man of whom the Elohist clearly approved.  Speiser concluded that the Jahwist and the Elohist therefore must have worked independently.

Genesis chapter 27

Gunther Plaut argued that Isaac was not really deceived. Reading the story with close attention to the personality of Isaac, Plaut concluded that throughout the episode, Isaac was subconsciously aware of Jacob's identity, but, as he was unable to admit this knowledge, he pretended to be deceived. Plaut thus saw a plot within a plot, as Rebekah and Jacob laid elaborate plans for deceiving Isaac, while unknown to them Isaac looked for a way to deceive himself, in order to carry out God's design to bless his less-loved son. Plaut argued that Isaac was old but not senile. In his heart, Isaac had long known that Esau could not carry on the burden of Abraham and that, instead, he had to choose his quiet and complicated younger son Jacob. In Plaut's reading, weak and indecisive man and father that Isaac was, he did not have the courage to face Esau with the truth. His own blindness and Rebekah's ruse came literally as a godsend. Plaut noted that Isaac did not reprimand Jacob. Plaut concluded that no one, not even Esau, was deceived, for even Esau knew that Jacob was the chosen one.

Commandments
According to Maimonides and Sefer ha-Chinuch, there are no commandments in the parashah.

In the liturgy

The Weekly Maqam
In the Weekly Maqam, Sephardi Jews each week base the songs of the services on the content of that week's parashah. For Parashat Toledot, Sephardi Jews apply Maqam Mahour, the maqam that portrays emotional instability and anger. This maqam is similar to Maqam Rast in tone. It is appropriate, because in this parashah, Esau portrays these character traits as he loses out on the major blessings.

Haftarah
A haftarah is a text selected from the books of Nevi'im ("The Prophets") that is read publicly in the synagogue after the reading of the Torah on Sabbath and holiday mornings. The haftarah usually has a thematic link to the Torah reading that precedes it.

The specific text read following Parashat Toledot varies according to different traditions within Judaism. Examples are:

for Ashkenazi Jews and Sephardi Jews: 
for Karaite Jews:

Connection to the parshah
Malachi 1 opens with God noting "I loved Jacob, and I hated Esau," before promising retribution on Esau's descendants, the people of Edom.

Notes

Further reading
The parashah has parallels or is discussed in these sources:

Biblical
 (numerous as stars);  (numerous as stars).
 (numerous as stars);  (not to go to Egypt).
.
 (not to go to Egypt).
.

Early nonrabbinic
Josephus. Antiquities of the Jews 1:18:1–2, 4–8, 19:1; 2:1:1. Circa 93–94. In, e.g., The Works of Josephus: Complete and Unabridged, New Updated Edition. Translated by William Whiston. Peabody, Massachusetts: Hendrickson Publishers, 1987.
Romans 
Hebrews

Classical rabbinic
Mishnah: Mishnah Kiddushin 4:14. Land of Israel, circa 200 C.E. In, e.g., The Mishnah: A New Translation. Translated by Jacob Neusner, page 499. New Haven: Yale University Press, 1988.
Tosefta: Berakhot 6:8; Sotah 10:5–6; Kiddushin 5:21. Land of Israel, circa 250 C.E. In, e.g., The Tosefta: Translated from the Hebrew, with a New Introduction. Translated by Jacob Neusner, volume 1, pages 39, 876, 947. Peabody, Massachusetts: Hendrickson Publishers, 2002.
Sifre to Deuteronomy 2:3. Land of Israel, circa 250–350 C.E. In, e.g., Sifre to Deuteronomy: An Analytical Translation. Translated by Jacob Neusner, volume 1, page 26. Atlanta: Scholars Press, 1987.

Jerusalem Talmud: Berakhot 55b, 85b; Bikkurim 23b; Sukkah 21a; Taanit 1b, 27b; Megillah 16a, 17b; Sotah 28b, 31b; Sanhedrin 62a; Avodah Zarah 3a. Tiberias, Land of Israel, circa 400 CE. In, e.g., Talmud Yerushalmi. Edited by Chaim Malinowitz, Yisroel Simcha Schorr, and Mordechai Marcus, volumes 2, 12, 22, 25–26, 36–37, 45, 47. Brooklyn: Mesorah Publications, 2006–2020. And in, e.g., The Jerusalem Talmud: A Translation and Commentary. Edited by Jacob Neusner and translated by Jacob Neusner, Tzvee Zahavy, B. Barry Levy, and Edward Goldman. Peabody, Massachusetts: Hendrickson Publishers, 2009.
Genesis Rabbah 63:1–67:13. Land of Israel, 5th Century. In, e.g., Midrash Rabbah: Genesis. Translated by Harry Freedman and Maurice Simon. London: Soncino Press, 1939.
Babylonian Talmud: Berakhot 5b, 7b, 56b, 57b; Eruvin 104b; Pesachim 5a, 42b; Yoma 28b; Sukkah 5b, 14a; Taanit 8b, 29b; Megillah 6a, 28a; Moed Katan 2a; Yevamot 64a; Ketubot 112a; Nedarim 32a; Sotah 11a, 12b, 13a, 41b; Gittin 57b; Kiddushin 82a; Bava Kamma 92b–93a; Bava Batra 15a, 16b, 123a; Sanhedrin 12a, 37a, 69a, 92a, 96b, 105a; Makkot 10a, 24a; Avodah Zarah 2b, 11a. Sasanian Empire, 6th Century. In, e.g., Talmud Bavli. Edited by Yisroel Simcha Schorr, Chaim Malinowitz, and Mordechai Marcus, 72 volumes. Brooklyn: Mesorah Pubs., 2006.

Medieval
Rashi. Commentary. Genesis 25–28. Troyes, France, late 11th Century. In, e.g., Rashi. The Torah: With Rashi's Commentary Translated, Annotated, and Elucidated. Translated and annotated by Yisrael Isser Zvi Herczeg, volume 1, pages 271–307. Brooklyn: Mesorah Publications, 1995.
Rashbam. Commentary on the Torah. Troyes, early 12th century. In, e.g., Rabbi Samuel Ben Meir's Commentary on Genesis: An Annotated Translation. Translated by Martin I. Lockshin, pages 130–62. Lewiston, New York: The Edwin Mellen Press, 1989.

Judah Halevi. Kuzari. 2:80. Toledo, Spain, 1130–1140. In, e.g., Jehuda Halevi. Kuzari: An Argument for the Faith of Israel. Introduction by Henry Slonimsky, page 128. New York: Schocken, 1964.
Abraham ibn Ezra. Commentary on the Torah. Mid-12th century. In, e.g., Ibn Ezra's Commentary on the Pentateuch: Genesis (Bereshit). Translated and annotated by H. Norman Strickman and Arthur M. Silver, pages 247–73. New York: Menorah Publishing Company, 1988.
Hezekiah ben Manoah. Hizkuni. France, circa 1240. In, e.g., Chizkiyahu ben Manoach. Chizkuni: Torah Commentary. Translated and annotated by Eliyahu Munk, volume 1, pages 187–214. Jerusalem: Ktav Publishers, 2013.
Nachmanides. Commentary on the Torah. Jerusalem, circa 1270. In, e.g., Ramban (Nachmanides): Commentary on the Torah: Genesis. Translated by Charles B. Chavel, volume 1, pages 313–48. New York: Shilo Publishing House, 1971.
Midrash ha-Ne'lam (The Midrash of the Concealed). Spain, 13th century. In, e.g., Zohar, part 1, pages 134b–40a. Mantua, 1558–1560. In, e.g., The Zohar: Pritzker Edition. Translation and commentary by Nathan Wolski, volume 10, pages 402–24. Stanford, California: Stanford University Press, 2016.
Zohar, part 1, pages 134a–46b. Spain, late 13th Century. In, e.g., The Zohar. Translated by Harry Sperling and Maurice Simon. 5 volumes. London: Soncino Press, 1934.
"Collection for the Poll Tax." Egypt, 14th century. In Mark R. Cohen. The Voice of the Poor in the Middle Ages: An Anthology of Documents from the Cairo Geniza, page 174. Princeton: Princeton University Press, 2005.
Nissim of Gerona (The Ran). Derashos HaRan (Discourses of the Ran), discourse 2. Barcelona, Catalonia, 14th century. In, e.g., Yehuda Meir Keilson. Derashos HaRan: Discourses of the Ran, Rabbeinu Nissim ben Reuven of Gerona, Translated, Annotated, and Elucidated. Volume 1, pages 110–97. Brooklyn: Mesorah Publications, 2019.
Mattathias Yizhari. "Sermon on Toledot." Spain, circa 1400. In Marc Saperstein. Jewish Preaching, 1200–1800: An Anthology, pages 156–66. New Haven: Yale University Press, 1989.
Isaac ben Moses Arama. Akedat Yizhak (The Binding of Isaac). Late 15th century. In, e.g., Yitzchak Arama. Akeydat Yitzchak: Commentary of Rabbi Yitzchak Arama on the Torah. Translated and condensed by Eliyahu Munk, volume 1, pages 177–95. New York, Lambda Publishers, 2001.

Modern
Isaac Abravanel. Commentary on the Torah. Italy, between 1492 and 1509. In, e.g., Abarbanel: Selected Commentaries on the Torah: Volume 1: Bereishis/Genesis. Translated and annotated by Israel Lazar, pages 147–84. Brooklyn: CreateSpace, 2015.
Obadiah ben Jacob Sforno. Commentary on the Torah. Venice, 1567. In, e.g., Sforno: Commentary on the Torah. Translation and explanatory notes by Raphael Pelcovitz, pages 130–47. Brooklyn: Mesorah Publications, 1997.
Solomon ben Isaac Levi. "Sermon on Toledot." Salonika, 1573. In Marc Saperstein. Jewish Preaching, 1200–1800: An Anthology, pages 240–52. New Haven: Yale University Press, 1989.
Moshe Alshich. Commentary on the Torah. Safed, circa 1593. In, e.g., Moshe Alshich. Midrash of Rabbi Moshe Alshich on the Torah. Translated and annotated by Eliyahu Munk, volume 1, pages 163–83. New York, Lambda Publishers, 2000.

Avraham Yehoshua Heschel. Commentaries on the Torah. Cracow, Poland, mid 17th century. Compiled as Chanukat HaTorah. Edited by Chanoch Henoch Erzohn. Piotrkow, Poland, 1900. In Avraham Yehoshua Heschel. Chanukas HaTorah: Mystical Insights of Rav Avraham Yehoshua Heschel on Chumash. Translated by Avraham Peretz Friedman, pages 70–77. Southfield, Michigan: Targum Press/Feldheim Publishers, 2004.
Thomas Hobbes. Leviathan, 3:36. England, 1651. Reprint edited by C. B. Macpherson, page 460. Harmondsworth, England: Penguin Classics, 1982.
Chaim ibn Attar. Ohr ha-Chaim. Venice, 1742. In Chayim ben Attar. Or Hachayim: Commentary on the Torah. Translated by Eliyahu Munk, volume 1, pages 200–34. Brooklyn: Lambda Publishers, 1999.

Samuel David Luzzatto (Shadal). Commentary on the Torah. Padua, 1871. In, e.g., Samuel David Luzzatto. Torah Commentary. Translated and annotated by Eliyahu Munk, volume 1, pages 241–71. New York: Lambda Publishers, 2012.
Yehudah Aryeh Leib Alter. Sefat Emet. Góra Kalwaria (Ger), Poland, before 1906. Excerpted in The Language of Truth: The Torah Commentary of Sefat Emet. Translated and interpreted by Arthur Green, pages 37–41. Philadelphia: Jewish Publication Society, 1998. Reprinted 2012.
John E. McFadyen. "Expository Studies in the Old Testament: III. Isaac and Jacob." The Biblical World, volume 29 (number 3) (March 1907): pages 219–30.

Abraham Isaac Kook. The Moral Principles. Early 20th Century. In Abraham Isaac Kook: the Lights of Penitence, the Moral Principles, Lights of Holiness, Essays, Letters, and Poems. Translated by Ben Zion Bokser, pages 142, 162. Mahwah, New Jersey: Paulist Press 1978.
Lewis Bayles Paton. "Archaeology and the Book of Genesis." The Biblical World, volume 46 (number 1) (July 1915): pages 25–32.
Alexander Alan Steinbach. Sabbath Queen: Fifty-four Bible Talks to the Young Based on Each Portion of the Pentateuch, pages 17–19. New York: Behrman's Jewish Book House, 1936.
Irving Fineman. Jacob, An Autobiographical Novel, pages 11–13, 16–18. New York: Random House, 1941.
David Daube. "How Esau Sold his Birthright." Cambridge Law Journal, volume 8 (1942): pages 70–75.

Thomas Mann. Joseph and His Brothers. Translated by John E. Woods, pages 37, 91, 97–100, 103–08, 113–14, 116–17, 134, 150, 153–73, 192–94, 242, 257, 298–99, 335, 340–41, 404, 414, 417, 428–30, 449, 524, 538, 669–70, 693, 806, 809. New York: Alfred A. Knopf, 2005. Originally published as Joseph und seine Brüder. Stockholm: Bermann-Fischer Verlag, 1943.
J. Mitchell Morse. "Jacob and Esau in ‘Finnegans Wake.’" Modern Philology, volume 52 (number 2) (November 1954): pages 123–30.
David N. Freedman. "The Original Name of Jacob." Israel Exploration Journal, volume 13 (1963): pages 125–26.
Walter Orenstein and Hertz Frankel. Torah and Tradition: A Bible Textbook for Jewish Youth: Volume I: Bereishis, pages 61–71. New York: Hebrew Publishing Company, 1964.
Delmore Schwartz. "Jacob." In Selected Poems: Summer Knowledge, pages 233–35. New York: New Directions, 1967.
Samuel Greengus. "Sisterhood Adoption at Nuzi and the ‘Wife-Sister’ in Genesis." Hebrew Union College Annual, volume 46 (1975): pages 5–31.
Seän M. Warner. “The Patriarchs and Extra-Biblical Sources.” Journal for the Study of the Old Testament, volume 1, number 2 (June 1976): pages 50–61.
J. Maxwell Miller. “The Patriarchs and Extra-Biblical Sources: a Response.” Journal for the Study of the Old Testament, volume 1, number 2 (June 1976): pages 62–66.
John R. Bartlett. “The Brotherhood of Edom.” Journal for the Study of the Old Testament, volume 2, number 4 (February 1977): pages 2–27. (39-40)
Mitchell Dahood. "Poetry versus a Hapax in Genesis 27,3." Biblica, volume 58 (number 3) (1977): pages 422–23.
Peter D. Miscall. “The Jacob and Joseph Stories as Analogies.” Journal for the Study of the Old Testament, volume 3, number 6 (April 1978): pages 28–40.
Donald J. Wiseman. "They Lived in Tents." In Biblical and Near Eastern Studies: Essays in Honor of William Sanford La Sor. Edited by Gary A. Tuttle, pages 195–200. Grand Rapids: Eerdmans, 1978.
C.G. Allen. "On Me Be the Curse, My Son." In Encounter with the Text: Form and History in the Hebrew Bible. Edited by Martin J. Buss, pages 159–72. Philadelphia: Fortress, 1979.
Michael Fishbane. "Genesis 25:19–35:22/The Jacob Cycle." In Text and Texture: Close Readings of Selected Biblical Texts, pages 40–62. New York: Schocken Books, 1979.
John G. Gammie. "Theological Interpretation by Way of Literary and Tradition Analysis: Genesis 25–36." In Encounter with the Text: Form and History in the Hebrew Bible. Edited by Martin J. Buss, pages 117–34. Philadelphia: Fortress, 1979.
Reuben Ahroni. "Why Did Esau Spurn the Birthright? A Study in Biblical Interpretation." Judaism, volume 29 (1980): pages 323–31.
Roland de Vaux. "The Separate Traditions of Abraham and Jacob." Biblical Archaeology Review, volume 6 (number 4) (July/August 1980).
Katherine Paterson. Jacob Have I Loved. New York: HarperCollins, 1980.
Amy K. Blank. "I Know Four" and Other Things.  1981. (poem about Rebekah).
Nehama Leibowitz. Studies in Bereshit (Genesis), pages 257–97. Jerusalem: The World Zionist Organization, 1981. Reprinted as New Studies in the Weekly Parasha. Lambda Publishers, 2010.
Walter Brueggemann. Genesis: Interpretation: A Bible Commentary for Teaching and Preaching, pages 204–41. Atlanta: John Knox Press, 1982.
Izak Cornelius. "Genesis XXVI and Mari: The Dispute over Water and the Socio-Economic Way of Life of the Patriarchs." Journal of Northwest Semitic Languages, volume 12 (1984): pages 53–61.
Frederick Buechner. The Magnificent Defeat, pages 10–18. Seabury Press, 1966. Reprinted San Francisco: Harper & Row, 1985.
Carl D. Evans. "The Jacob Cycle in Genesis: The Patriarch Jacob—An ‘Innocent Man': Moral ambiguity in the biblical portrayal." Bible Review, volume 2 (number 1) (Spring 1986).
Victor H. Matthews. "The Wells of Gerar." The Biblical Archaeologist, volume 49 (number 2) (June 1986): pages 118–26.
Pinchas H. Peli. Torah Today: A Renewed Encounter with Scripture, pages 25–28. Washington, D.C.: B'nai B'rith Books, 1987.

Louis H. Feldman. "Josephus' Portrait of Jacob." The Jewish Quarterly Review, New Series, volume 79 (number 2/3) (October 1988–January 1989): pages 101–51. 
Marc Gellman. "The Strong Man Who Cried." In Does God Have a Big Toe? Stories About Stories in the Bible, pages 57–59. New York: HarperCollins, 1989.
Nahum M. Sarna. The JPS Torah Commentary: Genesis: The Traditional Hebrew Text with the New JPS Translation, pages 177–97, 396–403. Philadelphia: Jewish Publication Society, 1989.
Mark E. Biddle. "The ‘Endangered Ancestress’ and Blessing for the Nations." Journal of Biblical Literature, volume 109 (number 4) (Winter 1990): pages 599–611.
Mark S. Smith. The Early History of God: Yahweh and the Other Deities in Ancient Israel, pages 17, 23, 67. New York: HarperSanFrancisco, 1990.
Ktziah Spanier. "Rachel's Theft of the Teraphim: Her Struggle for Family Primacy." Vetus Testamentum, volume 42 (number 3) (July 1992): pages 404–12.
Susan Ackerman. "Child Sacrifice: Returning God's Gift: Barren women give birth to exceptional children." Bible Review, volume 9 (number 3) (June 1993).
Robert Hayward. "Targum Pseudo-Jonathan to Genesis 27:31." The Jewish Quarterly Review, volume 84 (number 2/3) (October 1993–January 1994): pages 177–88.
Aaron Wildavsky. Assimilation versus Separation: Joseph the Administrator and the Politics of Religion in Biblical Israel, pages 5–6, 8, 13, 15, 17–29. New Brunswick, N.J.: Transaction Publishers, 1993.
Judith S. Antonelli. "Rivkah: Existential Struggle." In In the Image of God: A Feminist Commentary on the Torah, pages 60–71. Northvale, New Jersey: Jason Aronson, 1995.
Naomi H. Rosenblatt and Joshua Horwitz. Wrestling With Angels: What Genesis Teaches Us About Our Spiritual Identity, Sexuality, and Personal Relationships, pages 228–58. Delacorte Press, 1995.
Savina J. Teubal. "Naming is Creating: Biblical women hold the power." Bible Review, volume 11 (number 4) (August 1995).
Avivah Gottlieb Zornberg. The Beginning of Desire: Reflections on Genesis, pages 144–79. New York: Image Books/Doubelday, 1995.
Ellen Frankel. The Five Books of Miriam: A Woman’s Commentary on the Torah, pages 39–48. New York: G. P. Putnam's Sons, 1996.
Marc Gellman. "Bless Me, Too!" In God's Mailbox: More Stories About Stories in the Bible, pages 75–79. New York: Morrow Junior Books, 1996.
W. Gunther Plaut. The Haftarah Commentary, pages 54–63. New York: UAHC Press, 1996.

Sorel Goldberg Loeb and Barbara Binder Kadden. Teaching Torah: A Treasury of Insights and Activities, pages 39–45. Denver: A.R.E. Publishing, 1997.
Elie Wiesel. "Supporting Roles: Esau." Bible Review, volume 14 (number 2) (April 1998).
Jack Miles. "Supporting Roles: Jacob's Wrestling Match: Was it an angel or Esau?" Bible Review, volume 14 (number 5) (October 1998).
Susan Freeman. Teaching Jewish Virtues: Sacred Sources and Arts Activities, pages 69–84, 136–48. Springfield, New Jersey: A.R.E. Publishing, 1999..
John S. Kselman. "Genesis." In The HarperCollins Bible Commentary. Edited by James L. Mays, pages 97–100. New York: HarperCollins Publishers, revised edition, 2000.
Tamara Goshen-Gottstein. “The Souls that They Made: Physical Infertility and Spiritual Fecundity.” In Torah of the Mothers: Contemporary Jewish Women Read Classical Jewish Texts. Edited by Ora Wiskind Elper and Susan Handelman, pages 123–54. New York and Jerusalem: Urim Publications, 2000..

Israel Finkelstein and Neil Asher Silberman. "Searching for the Patriarchs." In The Bible Unearthed: Archaeology's New Vision of Ancient Israel and the Origin of Its Sacred Texts, pages 27–47. New York: The Free Press, 2001.
Tamar Hordes, Ami Hordes, and Joel B. Wolowelsky. "Kibbud Av and Kibbud Avot." Tradition: A Journal of Orthodox Jewish Thought, volume 35 (number 2) (Summer 2001): pages 91–94.
Lainie Blum Cogan and Judy Weiss. Teaching Haftarah: Background, Insights, and Strategies, pages 602–09. Denver: A.R.E. Publishing, 2002.
Michael Fishbane. The JPS Bible Commentary: Haftarot, pages 34–40. Philadelphia: Jewish Publication Society, 2002.
Tikva Frymer-Kensky. "The Hand that Rocks the Cradle: The Rivka Stories." In Reading the Women of the Bible, pages 5–23. New York: Schocken Books, 2002.
Peter Addinall. "Genesis XLVI 8–27." Vetus Testamentum, volume 54 (number 3) (July 2004): pages 289–300.
Robert Alter. The Five Books of Moses: A Translation with Commentary, pages 129–48. New York: W.W. Norton & Co., 2004.
Jon D. Levenson. "Genesis." In The Jewish Study Bible. Edited by Adele Berlin and Marc Zvi Brettler, pages 53–58. New York: Oxford University Press, 2004.
Don Seeman. "The Watcher at the Window: Cultural Poetics of a Biblical Motif." Prooftexts, volume 24 (number 1) (Winter 2004): pages 1–50.
Professors on the Parashah: Studies on the Weekly Torah Reading Edited by Leib Moscovitz, pages 54–55. Jerusalem: Urim Publications, 2005
Frank Anthony Spina. "Esau: The Face of God." In The Faith of the Outsider: Exclusion and Inclusion in the Biblical Story, pages 14–34. William B. Eerdmans Publishing Company, 2005.
W. Gunther Plaut. The Torah: A Modern Commentary: Revised Edition. Revised edition edited by David E.S. Stern, pages 172–93. New York: Union for Reform Judaism, 2006.
Suzanne A. Brody. "Esau's Prediction." In Dancing in the White Spaces: The Yearly Torah Cycle and More Poems, page 67. Shelbyville, Kentucky: Wasteland Press, 2007.
James L. Kugel. How To Read the Bible: A Guide to Scripture, Then and Now, pages 39, 101, 133–51, 166, 197, 524. New York: Free Press, 2007.
Susan Niditch. "My Brother Esau Is a Hairy Man": Hair and Identity in Ancient Israel. New York: Oxford University Press, 2008.
Dennis Sylva. "The Blessing of a Wounded Patriarch: Genesis 27.1–40." Journal for the Study of the Old Testament, volume 32 (number 3) (March 2008): pages 267–86.
Joachim J. Krause. "Tradition, History, and Our Story: Some Observations on Jacob and Esau in the Books of Obadiah and Malachi." Journal for the Study of the Old Testament, volume 32 (number 4) (June 2008): pages 475–86.

The Torah: A Women's Commentary. Edited by Tamara Cohn Eskenazi and Andrea L. Weiss, pages 133–56. New York: URJ Press, 2008.
Jonathan Goldstein. "Jacob and Esau." In Ladies and Gentlemen, the Bible! pages 79–114. New York: Riverhead Books, 2009.
Reuven Hammer. Entering Torah: Prefaces to the Weekly Torah Portion, pages 35–39. New York: Gefen Publishing House, 2009.
Sarra Lev. "Esau’s Gender Crossing: Parashat Toldot (Genesis 25:19–28:9)." In Torah Queeries: Weekly Commentaries on the Hebrew Bible. Edited by Gregg Drinkwater, Joshua Lesser, and David Shneer; foreword by Judith Plaskow, pages 38–42. New York: New York University Press, 2009.
Timothy Keller. "The End of Counterfeit Gods." In Counterfeit Gods: The Empty Promises of Money, Sex, and Power, and the Only Hope that Matters. Dutton Adult, 2009. (Jacob and Esau).

Jonathan Sacks. Covenant & Conversation: A Weekly Reading of the Jewish Bible: Genesis: The Book of Beginnings, pages 145–75. New Milford, Connecticut: Maggid Books, 2009.
Carolyn J. Sharp. "Pharaoh and Abimelech as Innocents Ensnared." In Irony and Meaning in the Hebrew Bible, pages 51–54. Bloomington, Indiana: Indiana University Press, 2009.
John H. Walton. "Genesis." In Zondervan Illustrated Bible Backgrounds Commentary. Edited by John H. Walton, volume 1, pages 104–06. Grand Rapids, Michigan: Zondervan, 2009.
Raymond Westbrook. "Good as His Word: Jacob Manipulates Justice." Biblical Archaeology Review, volume 35 (number 3) (May/June 2009): pages 50–55, 64.
Bradford A. Anderson. “The Inversion of the Birth Order and the Title of the Firstborn.” Vetus Testamentum, volume 60 (number 4) (2010): pages 655–58.
David J. Zucker. "The Deceiver Deceived: Rereading Genesis 27." Jewish Bible Quarterly, volume 39 (number 1) (January–March 2011): pages 46–58.
Calum Carmichael. The Book of Numbers: A Critique of Genesis, pages 4, 19–20, 91, 100–01, 103–05, 110, 112, 114–15, 118, 120–21, 123–24, 126–27, 130, 132, 135–36, 147, 149, 156, 162–63. New Haven: Yale University Press, 2012.
William G. Dever. The Lives of Ordinary People in Ancient Israel: When Archaeology and the Bible Intersect, page 173. Grand Rapids, Michigan: William B. Eerdmans Publishing Company, 2012.
Chee-Chiew Lee. Journal for the Study of the Old Testament, volume 36 (number 3) (March 2012): pages 279–96..

Shmuel Herzfeld. "A Crowning Achievement." In Fifty-Four Pick Up: Fifteen-Minute Inspirational Torah Lessons, pages 29–34. Jerusalem: Gefen Publishing House, 2012.
Josh Feigelson. "Knowledge, power and abuse." The Jerusalem Report, volume 25 (number 17) (December 1, 2014): page 47.
Jonathan Sacks. Lessons in Leadership: A Weekly Reading of the Jewish Bible, pages 27–30. New Milford, Connecticut: Maggid Books, 2015.
"The Hittites: Between Tradition and History." Biblical Archaeology Review, volume 42 (number 2) (March/April 2016): pages 28–40, 68.
Jean-Pierre Isbouts. Archaeology of the Bible: The Greatest Discoveries From Genesis to the Roman Era, pages 58–62. Washington, D.C.: National Geographic, 2016.
Jonathan Sacks. Essays on Ethics: A Weekly Reading of the Jewish Bible, pages 33–39. New Milford, Connecticut: Maggid Books, 2016.
Shai Held. The Heart of Torah, Volume 1: Essays on the Weekly Torah Portion: Genesis and Exodus, pages 49–59. Philadelphia: Jewish Publication Society, 2017.

Steven Levy and Sarah Levy. The JPS Rashi Discussion Torah Commentary, pages 18–20. Philadelphia: Jewish Publication Society, 2017.
Jeffrey K. Salkin. The JPS B'nai Mitzvah Torah Commentary, pages 25–30. Philadelphia: Jewish Publication Society, 2017.
Pallant Ramsundar. "Biblical Mistranslations to 'Euphrates' and the Impact on the Borders of Israel." American Journal of Biblical Theology (2019).
Liana Finck. Let There Be Light: The Real Story of Her Creation, pages 237–48. New York: Random House, 2022.

External links

Texts
Masoretic text and 1917 JPS translation
Hear the parashah chanted
Hear the parashah read in Hebrew

Commentaries

Academy for Jewish Religion, California
Academy for Jewish Religion, New York
Aish.com
Akhlah: The Jewish Children's Learning Network
Aleph Beta Academy
American Jewish University - Ziegler School of Rabbinic Studies
Anshe Emes Synagogue, Los Angeles
Ari Goldwag
Ascent of Safed
Bar-Ilan University
Chabad.org
eparsha.com
Jewish Agency for Israel
Jewish Theological Seminary
G-dcast
The Israel Koschitzky Virtual Beit Midrash
Mechon Hadar
Miriam Aflalo
MyJewishLearning.com
Ohr Sameach
Orthodox Union
OzTorah—Torah from Australia
Oz Ve Shalom—Netivot Shalom
Pardes from Jerusalem
Professor James L. Kugel
Rabbi Dov Linzer
Rabbi Fabian Werbin
Rabbi Jonathan Sacks
RabbiShimon.com
Rabbi Shlomo Riskin
Rabbi Shmuel Herzfeld
Rabbi Stan Levin
Reconstructionist Judaism
Sephardic Institute
Shiur.com
613.org Jewish Torah Audio
Tanach Study Center
Teach613.org, Torah Education at Cherry Hill
TheTorah.com
Torah from Dixie
Torah.org
TorahVort.com
Union for Reform Judaism
United Synagogue of Conservative Judaism
What's Bothering Rashi?
Yeshivat Chovevei Torah
Yeshiva University

Weekly Torah readings in Cheshvan
Weekly Torah readings from Genesis